This is a list of representatives from Kentucky to the Confederate Congress.

References
 Beers, Henry Putney, The Confederacy: A Guide to the Archives of the Government of the Confederate States of America. Washington, D.C.: United States National Archives and Records Administration, 1986.
 Current, Richard N., Encyclopedia of the Confederacy. New York: Simon & Schuster, 1993. .
 Journal of the Congress of the Confederate States of America, 1861-1865. Washington, D.C.: United States War Department, Government Printing Office, 1905.

Confederate Representatives